The 13th round of the 1988 B.A.R.C./B.R.D.C. Lucas Formula Three British Championship, saw the series visit Oulton Park for the 23rd International Gold Cup, on 21 August.

Report

Entry
A total of 33 F3 cars were entered for this round of the British F3 Championship.  Come race weekend only 27 arrived in Cheshire for qualifying.

Qualifying
JJ Lehto took pole position for Pacific Racing Team in their Toyota-engined Reynard 883, averaging a speed of 109.608 mph.

Race
The race was held over 20 laps of the Oulton Park circuit. Gary Brabham took the winner spoils for the Bowman Racing team, driving their Ralt-Volkswagen RT32. The Aussie won in a time of 30:29.17mins., averaging a speed of 108.967 mph. Brabham’s victory will 21 years after his father, Sir Jack Brabham, last won the Gold Cup. Second place went to JJ Lehto in Pacific Racing Team’s Reynard-Toyota 883, who was only 1.4 of a second behind. Another son of a famous racer, Damon Hill completed the podium for the Cellnet Ricoh Racing/Intersport Racing Team in his Toyota engined Ralt RT32. Completing the Brabham family domination of the race, Gary’s younger brother, David won the National Class, also in a Jack Brabham Racing prepared Ralt-Volkswagen.

Classification

Race
Class winners in bold

 Fastest lap: JJ Lehto, 1:30.68ecs. (109.874 mph)

References

British Formula Three Championship
International Gold Cup